3 (released August 24, 2009 in Oslo, Norway) is the sixth album by Susanna, and the third release in duo with Morten Qvenild as Susanna and the Magical Orchestra, released on the label Rune Grammofon (RCD 2090).

Background 
This is the third album release by the duo, with mostly original songs composed by the two of them individually. Joined on a few of the tracks by some of the elite jazz and prog rock musician of Norway. All About Jazz critique John Kelman, in his review of Susanna's album 3 states:

Reception 
The AllMusic reviewer Heather Phares awarded the album 4 stars, and Tiny Mix Tapes reviewer Split Foster awarded the album 4 stars.

Track listing 
 "Recall" (5:50)
 "Guiding Star" (4:39)
 "Game" (5:26)
 "Palpatine's Dream" (5:01)
 "Another Day" (3:56)
 "Deer Eyed Lady" (3:45)
 "Lost	4:43)
 "Subdivisions" (4:52)
 "Come On" (4:02)
 "Someday" (4:47)

Musicians 
Susanna Wallumrød - Vocals
Morten Qvenild - Keyboards

Additional musicians
Erland Dahlen - Drums & percussion (tracks 1 & 3)
Andreas Mjøs - Vibraphone (track 3)
Fredrik Wallumrød - Additional vocals (tracks 3 & 4)
Mariam Wallentin - Additional vocals (tracks 4 & 6)
Helge Sten - Guitar (track 6), keyboards (track 10)
Morten Barrikmo Engebretsen - Bass clarinet (track 7)

Credits 
Producer – Deathprod
Co-producer – Susanna and the Magical Orchestra
Design – Kim Hiorthøy
Mastered By – Bob Katz
Mixed by Helge Sten
Programming & arrangements by Susanna and the Magical Orchestra
Recorded by Helge Sten & Susanna And The Magical Orchestra
Lyrics and compositions by Morten Qvenild (tracks: 3-4, 6, 9), Susanna K. Wallumrød (tracks: 1-2, 7, 10), Roy Harper (track 5)
Composed by Alex Lifeson & Geddy Lee (track 8)
Lyrics by Neil Peart (track 8)

References

External links 
Susanna Official Website

2009 albums
Susanna Wallumrød albums